Karaoke Circus is a British Karaoke night where guest singers from the world of comedy compete alongside members of the public for a coveted prize. Sometimes called 'Ward & White's Karaoke Circus', the show was started by composer Martin White and stand-up comedian Danielle Ward in October 2008 at The Albany, Great Portland Street, London. It has since been held at the 100 Club, The Bethnal Green Working Men's Club, Ginglik, Royal Vauxhall Tavern and at The Edinburgh Fringe.

The show
The Karaoke Circus house band, who accompany the singers, is composed of Martin White (keyboards), Danielle Ward (bass guitar), Foz Foster (lead guitar, musical saw and vibraslap) and David Reed (drums). The band are joined by resident judges, Daniel Maier (and in his absence, Dan Tetsell) and 'The Baron', whose job it is to pick a winner from the evening's performances.

Notable guests

 Chris Addison
 Simon Amstell
 William Andrews
 Dan Antopolski
 David Cross
 Gus Brown
 Margaret Cabourn-Smith
 Johnny Candon
 Bridget Christie
 Andrew Collins
 Anna Crilly
 Justin Edwards
 Kevin Eldon
 Dave Gorman
 Tony Gardner
 Jeremy Hardy
 Hattie Hayridge
 John Hegley
 Richard Herring
 Laurence Howarth
 Colin Hoult
 Jessica Hynes
 Robin Ince
 Phill Jupitus
 Miles Jupp
 Sarah Kendall
 Michael Legge
 Toby Litt
 Josie Long
 Geoffrey McGivern
 Greg McHugh
 Ben Miller
 Tim Minchin
 Pappy's
 Sara Pascoe
 The Penny Dreadfuls
 Lucy Porter
 Carrie Quinlan
 Howard Read
 Garry Richardson
 Andy Riley
 John-Luke Roberts
 Waen Shepherd
 Isy Suttie
 Liza Tarbuck
 Tim Vine
 Katy Wix

References

External links 
Official Karaoke Circus website
Flickr set of photos from 2008 onwards

Karaoke